George or Joris van Egmont (c. 1504, in Egmond – 26 September 1560, in Saint-Amand Abbey) was a Christian religious authority and a bishop, who served as Bishop of Utrecht from 1535 to 1560.

Biography
George was the son of Jan III van Egmont. In 1526 he became canon and later deacon of the chapter of Liège. Next he became abbot of Saint-Amand Abbey (since destroyed in the wars of the Protestant Reformation and French Revolution) at Saint-Amand-les-Eaux, south of Tournai. Charles V, Holy Roman Emperor appointed him bishop of Utrecht in 1534 as a favour to the Dutch nobility. Because he had to be ordained as priest, his consecration as bishop was delayed for over a year. George stayed in Saint-Amand, and had a vicar manage the bishopric for him. He acted unsuccessfully against the rise of Calvinism.

Legacy

The stained glass window he donated with the theme of the baptism of Christ still exists in the Janskerk in Gouda. This window was designed and made by Dirk Crabeth in 1557-8.

After his death he was buried in Saint-Amand Abbey, but his heart was interred in a cenotaph in St. Martin's Cathedral, Utrecht. A portrait of George van Egmont from c. 1535, painted by his friend Jan van Scorel, is located in the Rijksmuseum Amsterdam.

1500s births
1559 deaths
Bishops of Utrecht
16th-century Roman Catholic bishops in the Holy Roman Empire
George
People from Egmond